Lech Koziejowski (born 3 April 1949) is a Polish fencer. He won a gold medal in the team foil event at the 1972 Summer Olympics and a bronze in the same event at the 1980 Summer Olympics.

References

1949 births
Living people
Polish male fencers
Olympic fencers of Poland
Fencers at the 1972 Summer Olympics
Fencers at the 1976 Summer Olympics
Fencers at the 1980 Summer Olympics
Olympic gold medalists for Poland
Olympic bronze medalists for Poland
Olympic medalists in fencing
Fencers from Warsaw
Medalists at the 1972 Summer Olympics
Medalists at the 1980 Summer Olympics
21st-century Polish people
20th-century Polish people